Kolstad is a surname of Norwegian origin. Notable people with the surname include:

Allen Kolstad (1931–2008), American farmer and politician from Montana 
Dean Kolstad (born 1968), Canadian former professional ice hockey defenceman 
Eva Kolstad (1918–1999), Norwegian politician for the Liberal Party 
Hal Kolstad (born 1935), American former pitcher in Major League Baseball 
Henki Kolstad (1915–2008), Norwegian actor 
Jonas Ueland Kolstad (born 1976), Norwegian football goalkeeper 
Lasse Kolstad (1922–2012), Norwegian actor 
Peder Kolstad (1878–1932), Norwegian politician from the Agrarian Party
Per Kolstad (born 1953), Norwegian musician

See also 
 Kolstad, Trondheim, a neighborhood in the Heimdal borough in Trondheim, Norway
 Kolstad, Finspångs
 Kolstad (Öland), Öland

References 

Norwegian-language surnames

no:Kolstad